The New Bern District Brigade was an administrative division of the North Carolina militia during the American Revolutionary War (1776–1783).  This unit was established by the North Carolina Provincial Congress on May 4, 1776, and disbanded at the end of the war.

Commanders
 Brigadier General Richard Caswell (1775-1777)
 Brigadier General William Bryan (1777-1779)
 Brigadier General William Caswell (1779-1783)
 Brigadier General John Simpson (Pro Tempore) (August 1780)
 Brigadier General James Armstrong (Pro Tempore) (2/7/1781 to 2/10/1781)
 Brigadier General John Bryan (1782)

Lieutenant Colonel Richard Dobbs Spaight from the Craven County Regiment served as an aide to general William Caswell.

Regiments
The following regiments were included in the New Bern District Brigade, which was subordinate to the North Carolina Militia and State Troops, Major General Ashe, beginning in 1778.  Each regiment contained companies of up to 50 men.

Beaufort County Regiment
The existing Beaufort County regiment was authorized as part of the North Carolina militia on September 9, 1775 by the North Carolina Provincial Congress, along with 34 other existing county regiments. Beaufort County had a small population and difficulties raising a militia.  This regiment was involved in the Battle of Brier Creek in Georgia on Marcy 3, 1779 and the Battle of Rockfish Creek on August 2, 1781 in North Carolina. The commanders of this regiment were:
 Colonel James Bonner (1775-1778)
 Colonel Thomas Bonner, Jr. (1778-1779), also a Lieutenant Colonel
 Colonel William Brown (1779-1783), also a 2nd Major

Craven County Regiment
The Craven County Regiment was one of the 35 existing county militias to be authorized as a regiment of the North Carolina militia by the North Carolina Provincial Congress on September 9, 1775.  It was active until the end of the war.  The colonels included:
 Colonel Joseph Leech (1775)
 Colonel John Bryan, Sr. (1775-1779)
 Colonel Christopher Neale (1776-1778)
 Colonel John Sitgreaves (1779-1783)
 Colonel John Tilman  (1778-1783), 2nd colonel

The Craven County regiment participated in 10 known engagements during the American Revolution:
 February 27, 1776, Battle of Moore's Creek Bridge in North Carolina
 March 3, 1779, Battle of Brier Creek in Georgia
 June 20, 1779, Battle of Stono Ferry in South Carolina
 March 28 to May 12, 1780, Siege of Charleston in South Carolina, 1780
 August 11, 1780, Little Lynches Creek in South Carolina
 August 16, 1780, Battle of Camden Court House in South Carolina
 April 25, 1781, Hobkirk's Hill in South Carolina
 July 8, 1781, New Bern in North Carolina
 August 2, 1781, Rockfish Creek in North Carolina
 April 4-17, 1782, Battle of Beaufort in North Carolina

Johnston County Regiment
The Johnston County Regiment was one of the 35 existing county militias to be authorized as a regiment of the North Carolina militia by the North Carolina Provincial Congress on September 9, 1775.  It was active until the end of the war.  The colonels included:
 Colonel Needham Bryan (17751776)
 Colonel William Bryan (17761777, 1781)
 Colonel Joseph Boon, Jr. (17771778)
 Colonel John Smith (17791783)

The Johnston County Regiment participated in 13 known battles and skirmishes in North Carolina, South Carolina and Georgia during the American Revolution:
 February 27, 1776, Battle of Moore's Creek Bridge in North Carolina
 March 3, 1779, Battle of Briar/Brier Creek in Georgia
 June 20, 1779, Battle of Stono Ferry in South Carolina
 March 28 to May 12, 1780, Siege of Charleston 1780 in South Carolina
 August 18, 1780, Battle of Fishing Creek in South Carolina
 February 1, 1781, Battle of Cowan's Ford
 March 15, 1781, New Garden Meeting House in North Carolina
 March 15, 1781, Battle of Guilford Court House
 April 25, 1781, Hobkirk's Hill in South Carolina
 August 2, 1781, Rockfish Creek in North Carolina
 August 17, 1781, Webber's Bridge in North Carolina
 September 13, 1781, Battle of Lindley's Mill in North Carolina
 September 1781, Brown Marsh in North Carolina

Jones County Regiment
The North Carolina General Assembly created the Jones County Regiment when it created Jones County out of the southern part of Craven County on January 30, 1779.  This regiment was active until the end of the war in 1783.

The officers of the Jones County Regiment were appointed by the Governor of North Carolina.  The commanders included:
 Colonel John Bryan (17791783)
 Colonel Nathaniel "Nathan" Bryan (2nd colonel, 1779)
 Colonel Waightstill Avery (17791780)
 Colonel Francis Avery (17811783)

The Jones County regiment was engaged in the following five known battles and skirmishes:
 March 28 to May 12, 1780, Siege of Charleston 1780 in South Carolina
 August 16, 1780, Battle of Camden Court House in South Carolina
 March 15, 1781, Battle of Guilford Court House in North Carolina
 August 2, 1781, Rockfish Creek in North Carolina
 August 17, 1781, Jumping Run in North Carolina

Pitt County Regiment
The Pitt County Regiment was one of the 35 existing county militias to be authorized as a regiment of the North Carolina militia by the North Carolina Provincial Congress on September 9, 1775.  It was active until the end of the war.  The colonels of this regiment included:
 Colonel John Simpson (1775-1783, commander), (August 1780, Brigadier General Pro Tempore of the New Bern District Brigade)
 Colonel John Salter (1780-1781, second colonel), (1776-1780, captain), (1781, captain in the 1st Battalion of Militia)
 Colonel James Gorham (1776-1780, major), (1780-1781, Lieutenant Colonel), (1781-1783, 2nd colonel) 

The Pitt County Regiment was engaged in the nine known battles and skirmishes:
 February 27, 1776, Battle of Moore's Creek Bridge in North Carolina
 March 3, 1779, Battle of Brier/Briar Creek in Georgia
 June 20, 1779, Battle of Stono Ferry in South Carolina
 March 28 to May 12, 1780, Siege of Charleston 1780 in South Carolina
 August 11, 1780, Little Lynches Creek in South Carolina
 August 16, 1780, Battle of Camden Court House in South Carolina
 May 6, 1781, Peacock's Bridge in North Carolina
 August 17, 1781, Webber's Bridge in North Carolina
 August 21, 1781, Kingston #2 in North Carolina

References

Bibliography
 
 
 

North Carolina militia
1776 establishments in North Carolina